Kemba Walden is an American lawyer. She is Acting National Cyber Director for the United States Government.

Education 
Walden graduated from Hampton University, Princeton University, and from Georgetown University Law Center.

Career 
Walden was an attorney at the Department of Homeland Security. She was counsel at the Digital Crimes Unit of Microsoft.

Walden was involved in the development of a National Cybersecurity Strategy.

In May 2022, she joined the Office of the National Cyber Director, becoming acting director on February 15, 2023.

References 

Living people
Year of birth missing (living people)
Lawyers